Abu al-Abbās Ahmad Ibn Idris al-Araishi al-Alami al-Idrisi al-Hasani (1760–1837) was a Moroccan Sunni Islamic scholar, jurist and Sufi, active in Morocco, the Hejaz, Egypt, and Yemen. His main concern was the revivification of the sunnah or practice of the Islamic prophet Muhammad. For this reason, his students, such as the great hadith scholar Muhammad ibn Ali as-Senussi, gave him the title Muhyi 's-Sunnah "The Reviver of the Sunnah". His followers founded a number of important Sufi tariqas which spread his teachings across the Muslim world.

Life
Ahmad Ibn Idris was born in 1760 near the city of Fez, Morocco. He studied at the University of al-Qarawiyyin. In 1799 he arrived in Mecca, where he would "exercise his greatest influence, attracting students from all corners of the Islamic world". In 1828 he moved to Zabīd in the Yemen, which historically had been a great center of Muslim scholarship. He died in 1837 in Sabya, which was then in Yemen, later was his grandson's capital, but is today part of Saudi Arabia.

He was the founder of the Idrisiyya, sometimes known as the "Muhammadiyya' or "Ahmadiyya" (not be to confused with the Ahmadiyya of Mirza Ghulam Ahmad) or the  after himself, and sometimes Muhammadiyya after Muhammad. This was not a Tariqa in the sense of an organized Sufi order, but rather a spiritual method, consisting of a set of teachings and litanies, aimed at nurturing the spiritual link between the disciple and Muhammad directly. His path became more popularly known as the Idrisiyya, and became widely spread in Libya, Egypt, the Sudan, East Africa (Somalia, Eritrea, Kenya), the Yemen, the Levant (Syria and Lebanon) and Southeast Asia (Malaysia, Singapore, Brunei). 

The litanies and prayers of Ibn Idris in particular gained universal admiration among Sufi orders and has been incorporated into the litanies and collections of many paths unrelated to Ibn Idris.

Teachings
Ibn Idris' teachings centered on the moral and spiritual education of the individual Muslim. He emphasized the importance of piety, prayer, religious learning (especially the Prophetic traditions), and close following of Muhammad's example. He would send his students to revive the Prophetic Sunna in different lands. Ibn Idris called for a revival of ijtihad. His criticism of blind and rigid following of the schools of law (madhhabs) was based on three concerns. First, the need for following the Prophetic traditions. Second, to reduce divisions between the Muslims. Third, mercy for the Muslims, because there were 'few circumstances on which the Quran and Sunna were genuinely silent, but if there was a silence on any question, then that silence was intentional on God's part- a divine mercy.' He therefore rejected any 'attempt to fill a silence deliberately left by God, and so to abrogate one of His mercies.' These academic concerns however did not play as important of a role in his teaching as the attention that they attracted from modern academics, and Radtke and Thomassen are correct when they stated that his teachings mainly focused on the moral and spiritual education of the individual Muslim. In a sense, the one teaching underlying all of his thought was a direct and radical attachment to God and Muhammad, achieved through piety, minimizing the mediation of any other human authority.

Followers
Ibn Idris' teachings were spread by a group of highly influential and distinguished students, among whom were:

 Muhammad ibn Ali as-Senussi, distinguished hadith scholar, who spread the Tariqa Ahmadiyya Muhammadiyya of Ibn Idris in Cyrenaica (Libya), where it became known as the Senussi.
 Mohammed Uthman al-Mirghani al-Khatim, founder of the Khatmiyya Order in Sudan and Eritrea.
 Abd al-Rahman ibn Mahmud (d. 1874, Mecca). A Somali disciple who spread the Tariqa Muhammadiyya in Somalia, where it is known as the Ahmadiyya or al-Ahmadiyya al-Rahmaniyya. It is the second biggest tariqa in Somalia after the Qadiriyya.

Among later figures who spread the teachings of Ibn Idris, perhaps the most distinguished were:
 Salih al-Ja'fari (d. 1979, Cairo), the Imam of the Azhar Mosque in Cairo. He edited and published the works of Ibn Idris and revived his path. He founded the Ja'fariyya Ahmadiyya Muhammadiyya path.

Descendants
Ibn Idris's grandson, Muhammad ibn Ali al-Idrisi, established a short-lived state, the Idrisid Emirate of Asir.

See also 
 Muhammad ibn Ali al-Sanusi

Notes

Bibliography
 Thomassen, Einar & Radtke, Bernd, (eds.) (1993) The Letters of Ahmad ibn Idris. London: Christopher Hurst. A collective volume containing the texts and translations of 35 letters to and from Ibn Idris. The contributors are Albrecht Hofheinz, Ali Salih Karrar, R.S. O’Fahey, B. Radtke & Einar Thomassen. Published by Northwestern University Press, Evanston, Illinois by arrangement with C. Hurst and Co. (Publishers) Ltd., London. 
 O'Fahey, Rex S. (1994) Enigmatic Saint, Ahmad Ibn Idris and the Idrisi Tradition,  This book details his early life and travels. The book also examines his relationships with his students, including Muhammad al-Sanusi and Muhammad Uthman al-Mirghani (founder of the Khatmiyya in the Sudan and Eritrea) and traces the influence of his ideas. Published by Northwestern University Press, Evanston, Illinois by arrangement with C. Hurst and Co. (Publishers) Ltd., London. 
Radtke, Bernd; O’Kane, John; Vikør, Knut S.; and O’Fahey, Rex S., The Exoteric Ahmad Ibn Idris: A Sufi's Critique of the Madhahib and the Wahhabis : Four Arabic Texts With Translation and Commentary (Islamic History and Civilization), ed. Brill, Leiden, 1999, 
 Sedgwick, Mark, Saints and Sons: The Making and Remaking of the Rashidi Ahmadi Sufi Order, 1799-2000, Leiden: Brill, 2005.
 Hidigh, Uthman, Anīs al-jalīs fī tarjamat sayyidī Ahmad ibn Idrīs, Mogadishu, n.d., pp. 112–124.
 Dajani, Samer, Reassurance for the Seeker: A Biography and Translation of Salih al-Ja'fari's al-Fawa'id al-Ja'fariyya, a Commentary on Forty Prophetic Traditions, Louisville, KY: Fons Vitae, 2013.
 Al-Sanusi, Muhammad ibn Ali, 'Kitab al-Musalsalat al-Ashr,' in al-Sanusi, al-Majmu'a al-mukhtara, Manchester, 1990.

1760 births
1837 deaths
18th-century Moroccan people
19th-century Moroccan people
18th-century Arabs
19th-century Arabs
Moroccan people of Arab descent
Moroccan scholars
Moroccan Sufi religious leaders
Moroccan Sufi writers
People from Fez, Morocco